The LG Chocolate KE800 is an update of the LG Chocolate KG800. The phone also is part of the Black Label Series II line of phones. The phone is marketed as a fashion phone, and newly contains a music player, a Micro SD memory card slot, as well as an FM radio. 

The phone comes in two versions: 
 Platinum: the bar under the screen is silver 
 Gold: the bar under the screen is gold. 
There is also a Limited Edition version which features a gold bar made of 14k gold.

Updates and changes

The phone has been updated in features from the original LG Chocolate to include a 2.0 MP camera with auto-focus, a 320×240 pixel screen, memory card support of up to 2 GB, and an FM radio. The GUI has also been redesigned and features a new menu style (known as Arc) which is a modification of the "list view". The phone's controls remain heat-sensitive and light up red. The phone adds a dedicated loudspeaker that can now be used for calls.

Design
The phone is a glossy black color, constructed of plastic; when slid up, the phone reveals a keypad alternating from black to gray, in a checkered pattern. The phone retains the same red heat-sensitive controls as the original LG Chocolate. There is a small metallic bar underneath the screen and above the directional controls that reads "Chocolate", "Black Label", or "Limited Edition". The rear of the phone has a loudspeaker and the battery and battery cover. Under the slide there is a camera with flash and a self-portrait mirror.

The retail box shares the same color scheme as the phone inside – yellow-gold and black (Gold Edition) or grey-silver and black (Platinum Edition). It is similar to the box of the other Black Label series handsets.

Included in retail box:

 LG Chocolate KE800
 Lithium-Ion polymer 800 mAh battery x2 (Two depending on country of purchase)
 LG PC Sync software
 Travel charger
 USB cable
 Instruction manual
 Phone strap and phone cleaner
 Headset 3.5 mm earphone adapter
 Earphones
 512 MB Memory Card (depending on country of purchase)

See also
 LG Electronics
 List of LG mobile phones
 LG Cyon
 LG Chocolate (KG800)

External links
 CNet.co.UK review
 GSMArena.com specs page
 GSMArena.com review
 Mobile-Review.com Spec Page
 LG Mobile homepage
 LG Chocolate microsite

KG800